Marc Wieser (born 13 October 1987) is a Swiss professional ice hockey right wing who is currently playing for HC Davos of the National League (NL).

His brother Dino Wieser is also plays alongside him professionally with HC Davos.

References

External links

1987 births
Living people
HC Davos players
EHC Biel players
SC Langenthal players
Swiss ice hockey right wingers